Mario Fernandez  (born July 13, 1993) is a Filipino boxer, who competes in the Bantamweight division. He represented the Philippines at the 2014 Asian Games and won the bronze medal in the event. Fernandez is a southpaw and a technical fighter with good footwork, speed and has a decent power in both hands.

Mario Fernandez is a multiple medalist of the South East Asian Games boxing Event in the Bantamweight Division.

References

1993 births
Living people
Sportspeople from Bukidnon
Filipino male boxers
Boxers at the 2014 Asian Games
Boxers at the 2018 Asian Games
Asian Games bronze medalists for the Philippines
Asian Games medalists in boxing
Medalists at the 2014 Asian Games
Southeast Asian Games gold medalists for the Philippines
Southeast Asian Games competitors for the Philippines
Southeast Asian Games silver medalists for the Philippines
Southeast Asian Games medalists in boxing
Competitors at the 2013 Southeast Asian Games
Competitors at the 2015 Southeast Asian Games
Competitors at the 2017 Southeast Asian Games
Bantamweight boxers